Elisa Mary Roberts (born 3 September 1970) is a former Australian politician. Born in Sydney, she served with the Australian Defence Force at Victoria Barracks in Paddington from 1989 to 1993, and received her Bachelor of Arts from the University of New South Wales in 1996. Having moved to Queensland, she was elected to the Legislative Assembly of Queensland in 2001 as the member for Gympie, representing Pauline Hanson's One Nation. She left the party on 18 April 2002 to sit as an independent, leaving only two One Nation MPs in the Parliament. She was re-elected as an independent in 2004, but was defeated in 2006 by National Party candidate David Gibson. She re-contested Gympie in 2009 but was unsuccessful.

References

One Nation members of the Parliament of Queensland
Independent members of the Parliament of Queensland
Politicians from Sydney
1970 births
Living people
University of New South Wales alumni
Members of the Queensland Legislative Assembly
21st-century Australian politicians
21st-century Australian women politicians
Women members of the Queensland Legislative Assembly